Anthony Akoto Osei was a Ghanaian  banker and politician. Osei was in the cabinet of President John Agyekum Kufuor as Minister of State for Finance and Economic Planning. He was a member of Parliament for the electoral district of Old Tafo in the Ashanti region.

Early life and education 
Osei was born in Sunyani, the capital of Bono Region then Brong Ahafo Region on 18 April 1953. He had his secondary level education at Achimota School and Opoku Ware Senior High School. He furthered at Oberlin College in Ohio where he obtained a bachelor's degree in economics. He has a Master of Arts degree in Applied Economics from the American University in the USA. He also graduated from Howard University in 1987 with a Ph.D. in economics.

Career 
Osei is an Economist by profession. On 27 March 2002, Osei became a member of the management board of Merchant Bank (Ghana) Ltd. Previously, he worked as associate professor at Dillard University (USA) and previously as a research assistant at the Center for Policy Analysis (Ghana).

Political career

Minister for Finance and Economic Planning 
Osei  worked as deputy minister for Finance and Economic Planning in May 2003 and was a major economic adviser to the government. He was elevated to substantive Minister for Finance and Economic Planning after the death of the then Minister Kwadwo Baah Wiredu. He served in that role until 6 January 2009 when government was handed over to the National Democratic Congress who had won the 2008 General Elections.

Minister for Monitoring and Evaluation 
In February 2017, Osei was sworn in as Minister of Monitoring and Evaluation after being nominated by President Nana Akufo-Addo and going through the vetting process in the parliament of Ghana. The ministry of Monitoring and Evaluation was a newly created Ministry to evaluate, monitor and plan review summits and forums in fulfillment of the government's policies on evaluating the progress of its own ministries.

Cabinet Minister
In May 2017, President Nana Akufo-Addo named Anthony Akoto Osei as part of nineteen ministers who would form his cabinet. The names of the 19 ministers were submitted to the Parliament of Ghana and announced by the Speaker of the House, Rt. Hon. Prof. Mike Ocquaye. As a Cabinet minister, Anthony Akoto Osei is part of the inner circle of the president and is to aid in key decision-making activities in the country.

Other positions held 
Centre for Policy Analysis (CEPA), Accra; Consultant to the World Bank (Korean Division), 1987; Associate professor in Economics at Howard Universities from 1984 to 1995; Special Adviser, MFEP, 2001–2003; Deputy Minister for Finance, 2003–2007; Minister of State, 2007–2008; Acting Minister of Finance, September 2008 - 6 January 2009; MP (January 2005 to date - 4th term)

Elections  
Osei was elected as the member of parliament for the Old Tafo constituency of the Ashanti Region of Ghana for the first time in the 2004 Ghanaian general elections. He won on the ticket of the New Patriotic Party. His constituency was a part of the 36 parliamentary seats out of 39 seats won by the New Patriotic Party in that election for the Ashanti Region. The New Patriotic Party won a majority total of 128 parliamentary seats out of 230 seats.  He was elected with 34,957 votes out of 44,000 total valid votes cast. This was equivalent to 79.4% of total valid votes cast. He was elected over Salu Ibrahim of the National Democratic Congress, Andrews K. Asamoah-Akoto of the Convention People's Party and Amediku Dominic D. Quarshie an independent candidate. These obtained 7,116, 426 and 1,501 votes respectively of the total valid votes cast. These were equivalent to 16.2%, 1% and 3.4% respectively of total valid votes cast.

In 2008, he won the general elections on the ticket of the New Patriotic Party for the same constituency. 8 His constituency was part of the 34 parliamentary seats out of 39 seats won by the New Patriotic Party in that election for the Ashanti Region. The New Patriotic Party won a minority total of 109 parliamentary seats out of 230 seats. He was elected with 36,171 votes out of 47,478 total valid votes cast.  This was equivalent to 76.18% of total valid votes cast. He was elected over Swallah Ali of the People's National Convention,  Dominic Kwabena Anomah of the National Democratic Congress,  Issah Abdul Salam of the Convention People's Party and Mohammed Rabui Umar of the  Reformed  Patriotic Democrats. These obtained 427, 10,386, 375 and 119 votes respectively out of the total valid votes cast. These were equivalent to 37.59%, 5.43% and 1.28% respectively of the total votes cast.

In 2012, he won the general elections once again for the same constituency. He was elected with 43,561 votes out of 57,478 total valid votes cast. This was equivalent to 75.79% of total valid votes cast. He was elected over Memuna Kabore Abu-Bakr Siddique of the National Democratic Congress, Faruk Muhammed Tankoh of People's National Convention and Issah Abdul Salam  of the Convention People's Party. These obtained 13,454, 149 and 314 votes respectively of the total valid votes cast. These were equivalent to 23.41%, 0.26% and 0.55% respectively of the total votes cast.

Personal life 
He is a Christian Catholic. He is married with three children. He died on the 20th of March, 2023.

See also 
 Kufuor government
 List of Ghanaian politicians

References

External links 
 Merchant Bank Ltd., engl.

Living people
Ghanaian bankers
Finance ministers of Ghana
Cabinet Ministers of Ghana
New Patriotic Party politicians
Ghanaian MPs 2013–2017
Ghanaian MPs 2017–2021
Ghanaian academics
Alumni of Achimota School
Alumni of Opoku Ware School
1953 births
Dillard University faculty